Day Pond State Park is a public recreation area covering  in the town of Colchester, Connecticut. The state park abuts Salmon River State Forest and is managed by the Connecticut Department of Energy and Environmental Protection. The park offers opportunities for hiking, swimming, shoreline fishing, picnicking and mountain biking.

History
Foundation stones and the park's pond are the few remaining signs of the pioneering Day family, who built the pond to provide waterpower to operate the family sawmill. The land became a state park in 1949.

Activities and amenities
The park is designated for trout management and offers shoreline fishing on Day Pond. Park trails connect with approximately five miles of trails in the adjoining state forest. Swimming is also available.

Day Pond Brook Falls
The falls were once not well known and could not be accessed without bushwhacking. But in 2010, a spur trail was created by a Boy Scout to provide easier access to the falls for the public.

References

External links

Day Pond State Park Connecticut Department of Energy and Environmental Protection
Day Pond State Park Map Connecticut Department of Energy and Environmental Protection

State parks of Connecticut
Colchester, Connecticut
Parks in New London County, Connecticut
Protected areas established in 1949
1949 establishments in Connecticut